NHL Blades of Steel '99, known as NHL Pro 99 in Europe, is an ice hockey game for Nintendo 64 and Game Boy Color (as NHL Blades of Steel). The N64 version has Controller Pak and Rumble Pak support. NHL Blades of Steel '99 is the second game in the Blades of Steel series following Blades of Steel for the NES. The third and last game in the series, NHL Blades of Steel 2000, was released for the PlayStation.

Features
 All 27 NHL teams including the expansion Nashville Predators. 
 Western and Eastern conference All-Star teams. 
 Updated 98-99 team rosters. 
 Create-a-player mode. 
 Three game play modes: exhibition, season, and playoffs. 
 Season and Playoff state tracking in more than 35 categories.  
 Four player simultaneous multiplayer mode.

Reception

The game received "mixed" reviews on both platforms according to the review aggregation website GameRankings. IGN said of the N64 version, "Konami's NHL Blades of Steel '99 title was plagued by terrible gameplay and horrible control and few nice touches didn't compensate for a disappointing and generally dull game." Nintendo Power gave the same console version a mixed review over a month before it was released stateside, while the same magazine gave the GBC version a mixed review over two months before it was released.

Notes

References

External links

1999 video games
Cancelled PlayStation (console) games
Game Boy Color games
Konami games
Nintendo 64 games
Video games set in Canada
National Hockey League video games
Video games developed in Japan